KALK (97.7 FM) is a radio station broadcasting a classic hits format. Licensed to Winfield, Texas, United States, the station serves the Paris area. The station is currently owned by East Texas Broadcasting, Inc.

History
The station went on the air as KLSB on May 28, 1986. On October 1, 1988, the station changed its call sign to KYKM, and on January 1, 1991, to the current KALK. 
 As of October 20, 2011, K-LAKE tweaked its format from Adult Hits to Classic Hits.

References

External links

ALK
Radio stations established in 1986
1986 establishments in Texas